Diego de Astorga y Céspedes (17 October 1663 – 9 February 1734) was a Spanish Cardinal of the Roman Catholic Church. He also served as Bishop of Barcelona, Archbishop of Toledo and Grand Inquisitor.

Biography 
Diego de Astorga y Céspedes was born in Gibraltar, then a Spanish town. He obtained a degree on Canon law at the University of Granada and was ordained in 1689. In 1705, he was appointed General Vicar of Ceuta (as the bishop, Vidal Marín del Campo, had been named Grand Inquisitor) and Inquisitor of the kingdom of Murcia in 1710. He was consecrated as Bishop of Barcelona in 1716, being the first non-Catalan priest to serve as bishop in Barcelona, due to the abolition of the provisos on foreign bishops in Catalonia by the Nueva Planta decrees, issued by Philip V of Spain after the austriacist defeat in the War of the Spanish Succession.

Four years later, in 1720, he was consecrated as Archbishop of Toledo and therefore Primate of Spain. He was also appointed Grand Inquisitor (although he resigned the same year). In 1727, he was created Cardinal by Pope Benedict XIII. However, he never received the red hat and the title and did not participate in the 1730 conclave, which elected Pope Clement XII. He was also a member of the Privy council of the king Philip V after his abdication to his son Louis I.

He ordered the crafting of El Transparente of the Cathedral of Toledo to Narciso Tomé, an example of the intrincated Spanish Baroque set behind the main altar of the main chapel (the chapel of the Santísimo Sacramento). The Bishop wished to mark the presence of the Holy Sacrament with a glorious monument, which cost 200,000 ducats and was the cause of great enthusiasm, even with a poem wherein the monument was acclaimed 'the Eighth Wonder of the World'.

Cardinal Astorga y Céspedes died in 1734 in Madrid and is buried at the feet of El Transparente in the cathedral of Toledo.

During his whole career, Bishop De Astorga y Céspedes promoted the devotion to Our Lady of Europe, the devotion title given to the Blessed Virgin Mary in Gibraltar.

References

External links 
Diego Cardinal Astorga y Céspedes in catholic-hierarchy.org
The Cardinals of the Holy Roman Church. Biographical Dictionary. Pope Benedict XIII (1724–1730). Consistory of November 26, 1727 (VII)

1663 births
1735 deaths
Archbishops of Toledo
18th-century Spanish cardinals
Spanish people from Gibraltar
Grand Inquisitors of Spain
Bishops of Barcelona
18th-century Roman Catholic archbishops in Spain